Jean (Jean Benoît Guillaume Robert Antoine Louis Marie Adolphe Marc d'Aviano; 5 January 1921 – 23 April 2019) was the Grand Duke of Luxembourg from 1964 until his abdication in 2000. He was the first Grand Duke of Luxembourg of French agnatic descent.

Jean was the eldest son of Grand Duchess Charlotte and Prince Felix. Jean's primary education was initially in Luxembourg, before attending Ampleforth College in England. In 1938, he was officially named Hereditary Grand Duke as heir-apparent to the throne of Luxembourg. While Luxembourg was occupied by Germans during the Second World War, the grand ducal family was abroad in exile. Jean studied at the Université Laval in Quebec City. Jean later volunteered to join the British army's Irish Guards in 1942, and after graduating from the Royal Military Academy Sandhurst, received his commission in 1943. He participated in the Normandy landings and the Battle for Caen, and joined the Allied forces in the liberation of Luxembourg. From 1984 until 2000, he was Colonel of the Regiment of the Irish Guards.

On 9 April 1953, Jean married Princess Joséphine-Charlotte of Belgium with whom he had five children. On 12 November 1964, Grand Duchess Charlotte abdicated and Jean succeeded her as Grand Duke of Luxembourg. He then reigned for 36 years before he himself abdicated on 7 October 2000 and was succeeded by his son, Grand Duke Henri.

Early life
Jean was born on 5 January 1921, at Berg Castle, in central Luxembourg, the son of Grand Duchess Charlotte and of Prince Félix. Among his godparents was Pope Benedict XV, who gave him his second name. He attended primary school in Luxembourg, where he continued the initial stage of secondary education. He completed secondary school at Ampleforth College, a Roman Catholic boarding school in the United Kingdom. Upon reaching maturity, on 5 January 1939 he was styled 'Hereditary Grand Duke', recognising his status as heir apparent.

Second World War
On 10 May 1940, Germany invaded Luxembourg, beginning a four-year occupation. Having been warned of an imminent invasion, the Grand Ducal Family escaped the previous night. At first, they sought refuge in Paris, before fleeing France only weeks later, after receiving transit visas to Portugal from the Portuguese consul Aristides de Sousa Mendes, in June 1940. They arrived at Vilar Formoso on 23 June 1940. After travelling through Coimbra and Lisbon, the family first stayed in Cascais, in Casa de Santa Maria, owned by Manuel Espírito Santo, who was then the honorary consul for Luxembourg in Portugal. By July they had moved to Monte Estoril, staying at the Chalet Posser de Andrade. On 10 July 1940, Prince Jean, together with his father Prince Félix, his siblings, Princess Elisabeth, Princess Marie Adelaide, Princess Marie Gabriele, Prince Charles and Princess Alix, the nanny Justine Reinard and the chauffeur Eugène Niclou, along with his wife Joséphine, boarded the S.S. Trenton headed for New York City, where they sought refuge during the war in a rented estate in Brookville, New York.

The Grand Ducal Family sought refuge in the United States, renting an estate in Brookville, New York. Jean studied Law and Political Science at Université Laval, Quebec City.

He joined the British Army as a volunteer in the Irish Guards in November 1942. After receiving officer training at the Royal Military College at Sandhurst, Jean was commissioned as a lieutenant on 30 July 1943, before being promoted to captain in 1944. He landed in Normandy on 11 June 1944, and took part in the Battle for Caen and the liberation of Brussels. On 10 September 1944, he took part in the liberation of Luxembourg before moving on to Arnhem and the invasion of Germany. He relinquished his commission in the British Army on 26 June 1947. From 1984 until his abdication, he served as Colonel of the Regiment of the Irish Guards, often riding in uniform behind Queen Elizabeth II during the Trooping the Colour.

Reign

Jean was named Lieutenant-Representative of the Grand Duchess on 28 April 1961. He became Grand Duke when his mother, Grand Duchess Charlotte, abdicated on 12 November 1964. The same day, he was made a General of the Armed Forces of Luxembourg.

From the beginning of his reign, Grand Duke Jean's priorities included the well-being of his people and the completion of European unity. In the words of President Georges Pompidou of France, "If Europe had to choose a hereditary president, it would certainly be the Grand Duke of Luxembourg". Indeed, during his reign Grand Duke Jean saw Luxembourg transformed from a minor industrial contributor into an international financial centre. In 1986, he was honoured with the Charlemagne Prize in Aachen for his efforts towards European integration.

The Grand Duke's reign was one of the most prosperous periods in the history of the Grand Duchy of Luxembourg. The degree of stability in the country's politics, economy and social life was without precedent, thanks in part to the influence of the Grand Duke and his wife. He abdicated on 7 October 2000, and was succeeded on the throne by his son Henri.

Luxembourg's museum of modern art Mudam was officially named "Musée d'Art Moderne Grand-Duc Jean" to commemorate his reign which lasted 36 years. It was inaugurated in his presence in July 2006.

Retirement and death

In the summer of 2002, Grand Duke Jean and Grand Duchess Joséphine Charlotte took up residence at Fischbach Castle. After his wife died in January 2005, the Grand Duke continued to live there alone. On 27 December 2016, Grand Duke Jean was hospitalized due to bronchitis and was discharged from hospital on 4 January 2017, a day before he celebrated his 96th birthday.

Death
Surrounded by his family, Grand Duke Jean died at 00.25 CEST on 23 April 2019 at the age of 98 after he had been hospitalized for a pulmonary infection. 
He had become the world's oldest living monarch by the time of his death.

His funeral was held on Saturday, 4 May at the Notre-Dame Cathedral, Luxembourg after a period of mourning of 12 days.

Tributes
Jean-Claude Juncker, president of the European Commission and former prime-minister of Luxembourg, described Jean's death as "a great loss for the Grand Duchy and for Europe". He added, "Like all the people of Luxembourg, I had great esteem for this man of commitment, kindness and courage."

Luxembourg's prime-minister, Xavier Bettel, alluded to his service in the Second World War: "Grand Duke Jean fought for our freedom, for our independence and for the unity of our country and we will always be grateful. A family man left us today. A great statesman, a hero, an example – and a very beloved and gracious man."

Tributes followed from the Belgian royal family, commenting "His courage, his dignity and his high sense of duty will remain as an example... The whole of Belgium shares the grief of the Luxembourg people."

In their tribute, the Dutch royal family mentioned "the friendship and warmth he radiated", adding "With his thoughtfulness and humanity, he added to calm and confidence in his country and Europe."

In their tribute, the British royal family said that the Grand Duke will be "missed, both inside and outside Luxembourg".

In the tribute from the Romanian Royal Family via a post on their websites, they mentioned that "The entire Royal Family of Romania is alongside the Grand Duchy of Luxembourg in these sad and painful moments"; also written was their very close relations (via Queen Anne who was a paternal first cousin of his) as well as "a lifetime of friendship"; the head of the family, Crown Princess Margareta, sent a letter of condolences to her cousin, Grand Duke Henri.

The president of the International Olympic Committee Thomas Bach paid tribute to Grand Duke Jean who had joined the IOC in 1946 and had been an honorary member since 1998. "He was always a very calm and well-balanced person who was highly respected by the entire Olympic Movement because of his integrity... The IOC will always hold him in the highest honour and with the greatest respect."

Marriage and family

In October 1952, Jean was officially engaged to Princess Joséphine-Charlotte of Belgium, his third cousin, the only daughter of King Leopold III of the Belgians and his first wife, Princess Astrid of Sweden. There had been speculation that the marriage was arranged to improve relations between Luxembourg and Belgium but it soon became apparent that a love match was blooming between two longtime friends.

They were married in Luxembourg on 9 April 1953, first in the Hall of Ceremonies at the Grand Ducal Palace, later in Luxembourg's Notre-Dame Cathedral. The marriage put an end to the tensions between Luxembourg and Belgium which arose from 1918 to 1920 when there had been a threat of annexation. The couple had five children, 22 grandchildren and 15 great-grandchildren:

Archduchess Marie-Astrid of Austria (17 February 1954) she married Archduke Carl Christian of Austria on 6 February 1982. They have five children and nine grandchildren.
Henri, Grand Duke of Luxembourg (16 April 1955), he married María Teresa Mestre y Batista on 14 February 1981. They have five children and five grandchildren.
Prince Jean (15 May 1957) he married Hélène Vestur on 27 May 1987 and they were divorced in 2004. They have four children and two grandsons. He remarried Diane de Guerre on 18 March 2009.
Princess Margaretha (15 May 1957) she married Prince Nikolaus of Liechtenstein on 20 March 1982. They have four children.
Prince Guillaume (born 1 May 1963) he married Sibilla Weiller on 8 September 1994. They have four children.

Titles, styles, honours and awards

Titles and styles
Jean renounced the titles of the House of Bourbon-Parma for himself and his family in 1986. This decree was however repealed by another decree on 21 September 1995.

The Arrêté Grand-Ducal (Grand Ducal decree) of 21 September 1995 established that the title of Prince/Princesse de Luxembourg is reserved for the children of the sovereign and the heir to the throne. It also stated that the descendants in male lineage of the sovereign should be styled as Royal Highnesses and titled Prince/Princess of Nassau and that the descendants of unapproved marriages should be styled as Count/Countess of Nassau.

Honours

National
 Recipient of the Military Medal (17 December 2002)
 Recipient of the Luxembourg War Cross with bronze palm
 Recipient of the Cross of the Order of Resistance

Foreign
 Austria
 Austrian Imperial and Royal Family:
 1,293rd Knight of the Imperial and Royal Order of the Golden Fleece
:
 Grand Cross of the Order of Honour for Services to the Republic of Austria (1975)
 :
 Knight Grand Cross of the Order of Leopold I
 Recipient of the World War II Cross of War Medal with bronze palm
 :
 Knight of the Order of the Elephant (22 November 1976)
 :
 Grand Cross with Collar of the Order of the White Rose of Finland (1993)
 :
 Grand Cross of the Order of the Legion of Honour
 Recipient of the World War II Cross of War Medal
 :
 Grand Cross Special Class of the Order of Merit of the Federal Republic of Germany
  Greek Royal Family:
 Knight Grand Cross of the Royal Order of the Redeemer
 :
 Knight of the Order of the Golden Spur
 :
 Grand Cross with Collar of the Order of the Falcon
  Empire of Iran:
 Recipient of the Commemorative Medal of the 2, 500th Year Celebration of the founding of the Persian Empire (14 October 1971)
 :
 Grand Cross with Collar of the Order of Merit of the Italian Republic (26 October 1973)
: 
 Knight of the Supreme Order of the Most Holy Annunciation
 Knight Grand Cross of the Order of Saints Maurice and Lazarus
 Knight Grand Cross of the Order of the Crown of Italy
 :
 Knight Grand Cordon with Collar of the Order of the Chrysanthemum
 :
 Bailiff Knight Grand Cross of Justice of the Sovereign Military Order of Malta, Special Class
 :
 Knight Grand Cross of the Order of the Lion of the Netherlands
 Recipient of the Queen Juliana Inauguration Medal
 Recipient of the Silver Wedding Anniversary Medal of Queen Juliana and Prince Bernhard
 Recipient of the Wedding Medal of Princess Beatrix and Claus van Amsberg
 Recipient of the War Commemorative Cross
 :
 Knight Grand Cross with Collar of the Order of Saint Olav (1964)
 :
 Grand Cross of the Order of Merit of the Republic of Poland
 :
 Grand Cross with Collar of the Order of the Tower and Sword
 Grand Cross with Collar of the Order of Infante Dom Henrique (29 January 1985)
 :
 1,184th Knight of the Royal Order of the Golden Fleece (8 July 1980)
 Knight Grand Cross with Collar of the Order of Charles III (16 June 1983)
:
 Knight with Collar of the Royal Order of the Seraphim (18 July 1951)
 Recipient of the 50th Birthday Commemorative Medal of King Carl XVI Gustaf (30 April 1996)
 :
 Knight of the Order of the Royal House of Chakri (17 October 1960)
 :
 948th Stranger Knight of the Order of the Garter (1972)
 Recipient of the 1939-1945 Star Medal
 Recipient of the France and Germany Star Medal
 Recipient of the Defence Medal
 Recipient of the World War II War Medal
 Recipient of the Queen Elizabeth II Coronation Medal
 :
 Recipient of the Silver Star Medal

Other honours

Academic
 
 : Honorary Degree of the University of Laval
 : 
 : Honorary Degree of the University of Strasbourg
 
 : Honorary Degree of the University of Miami

Organizations
  Bronze Wolf Award for contributions to worldwide Scouting, 1995
 Gold Olympic Order, 1998

Ancestry

Patrilineal descent

Patrilineal descent is the principle behind membership in royal houses, as it can be traced back through the generations - which means that if Grand Duke Jean were to choose an historically accurate house name it would be Robertian, as all his male-line ancestors have been of that house.

Jean is a member of the House of Bourbon-Parma, a sub-branch of the House of Bourbon-Spain, itself originally a branch of the House of Bourbon, and thus of the Capetian dynasty and of the Robertians.

Jean's patriline is the line from which he is descended father to son. It follows the Dukes of Parma as well as the Kings of Spain, France, and Navarre. The line can be traced back more than 1,200 years from Robert of Hesbaye to the present day, through Kings of France & Navarre, Spain and Two-Sicilies, Dukes of Parma and Grand-Dukes of Luxembourg, Princes of Orléans and Emperors of Brazil. It is one of the oldest in Europe.

Robert II of Worms and Rheingau (Robert of Hesbaye), 770 - 807
Robert III of Worms and Rheingau, 808 - 834
Robert IV the Strong, 820 - 866
Robert I of France, 866 - 923
Hugh the Great, 895 - 956
Hugh Capet, 941 - 996
Robert II of France, 972 - 1031
Henry I of France, 1008–1060
Philip I of France, 1053–1108
Louis VI of France, 1081–1137
Louis VII of France, 1120–1180
Philip II of France, 1165–1223
Louis VIII of France, 1187–1226
Saint Louis IX of France, 1215–1270
Robert, Count of Clermont, 1256–1317
Louis I, Duke of Bourbon, 1279–1342
James I, Count of La Marche, 1319–1362
John I, Count of La Marche, 1344–1393
Louis, Count of Vendôme, 1376–1446
Jean VIII, Count of Vendôme, 1428–1478
François, Count of Vendôme, 1470–1495
Charles de Bourbon, Duke of Vendôme, 1489–1537
Antoine of Navarre, 1518–1562
Henry IV of France, 1553–1610
Louis XIII of France, 1601–1643
Louis XIV of France, 1638–1715
Louis, Dauphin of France (1661–1711), 1661–1711
Philip V of Spain, 1683–1746
Philip, Duke of Parma, 1720–1765
Ferdinand, Duke of Parma, 1751–1802
Louis of Etruria, 1773–1803
Charles II, Duke of Parma, 1799–1883
Charles III, Duke of Parma, 1823–1854
Robert I, Duke of Parma, 1848–1907
Felix of Bourbon-Parma, 1893–1970
Jean, Grand Duke of Luxembourg, 1921–2019

References

External links

Official biography (in French)
Cour Grand-Ducale de Luxembourg (in French)
 

|-

1921 births
2019 deaths
Grand Dukes of Luxembourg
Members of the Council of State of Luxembourg
Irish Guards officers
British Army personnel of World War II
Luxembourgian people of World War II
Luxembourgian Roman Catholics
Luxembourgian anti-communists
People from Colmar-Berg
House of Nassau-Weilburg
People educated at Ampleforth College
Princes of Bourbon-Parma
International Olympic Committee members
Université Laval alumni
Monarchs who abdicated
Burials at Notre-Dame Cathedral, Luxembourg

Grand Crosses of the Order of Merit of the Grand Duchy of Luxembourg

Knights of the Golden Fleece of Austria
Knights of the Golden Fleece of Spain
Grand Collars of the Order of Prince Henry
Extra Knights Companion of the Garter
Recipients of the Silver Star
Recipients of the Olympic Order
Knights Grand Cross with Collar of the Order of Merit of the Italian Republic
Recipients of the Grand Star of the Decoration for Services to the Republic of Austria
Recipients of the Bronze Wolf Award